U.S. Highway 11 (US 11) is a major north–south United States Numbered Highway that runs from New Orleans, Louisiana, to Rouses Point, New York. The Mississippi section of US 11 is defined in Mississippi Code Annotated § 65-3-3.

Route description
Throughout the state of Mississippi, US 11 closely parallels Interstate 59 (I-59).

Pearl River County
US 11 enters the state of Mississippi along I-59. After a short distance, US 11 and I-59 interchange at exit 1 with Mississippi Highway 607 (MS 607), where MS 607 ends and US 11 takes over its northeastern alignment. US 11 heads to the northeast in the community of Nicholson, where it parallels the Norfolk Southern Railway tracks.

The highway progresses northward along with the railroad tracks. The three are connected soon after at an intersection with Section Line Road, which runs westbound from US 11. Several miles north of the interchange from I-59, I-59 begins to parallel once again to the far east. After a while, US 11 intersects with South Haugh Avenue. US 11 continues northward where the highway enters the city of Picayune.

A short distance into Picayune, US 11 intersects with a divided highway segment of MS 43. US 11 and the railroad tracks continue to the north and intersects with West and East Canal streets in the center of Picayune. After the intersection with East 4th Street, US 11 continues northeastward.

After a short distance, US 11 intersects with East Sycamore Road, an alignment of MS 43. North of MS 43, the highway continues northward, entering the community of Richardson. US 11 continues northward into the community of Ozona, paralleling an original alignment, which is signed to the east. After the intersection the US 11 heads toward the community of Carriere. US 11 soon afterward enters the community of Hawthorne. The US 11 then enters the community of McNeill. After McNeill, US 11 turns to the northeast once again. US 11 passes through the communities of Tyler and Millard.

US 11 heads to the east and enters the community of Derby. There, US 11 turns to the northeast, intersecting with MS 26. After that intersection, US 11 continues northward into Poplarville. In Poplarville, the highway intersects with a short, original alignment of itself. As the highway continues northward, it begins to parallel I-59 once again. After a short distance, US 11 leaves Pearl River County for Lamar County. After the county crossing, Red Top Road merges in, and the route begins paralleling the nearby railroad tracks. After a short distance, US 11 enters the city of Lumberton.

Lamar County
US 11 enters the city of Lumberton once crossing the county line then heads to the local community of Seneca. The highway continues to the northeast, entering the community of Talowah and passes through the city of Purvis. Paralleling the original alignment, the two roads eventually intersect and switch directions; eventually, it will intersect with MS 589, which becomes concurrent. US 11 enters the community of Richburg before crossing the county line and into Forrest County.

Forrest County
In the community of Richburg, US 11 crosses the county line from Lamar County and into Forrest County. The highway interchanges with exit 60 on I-59 and US 98 then enters the community of Bonhome. At an intersection with Richburg Road, US 11 leaves Bonhome and enters the large city of Hattiesburg.

In Hattiesburg, US 11 makes a curve to the north and changes to Broadway. US 11 becomes a divided highway and reaches an interchange with US 49 at a complete cloverleaf interchange. After the interchange ends, US 11 continues to the north, and, after the intersection with 64th Street, US 11 enters the city with commercial buildings surrounding the highway. In the city, US 11 parallels some nearby railroad tracks.

US 11 comes back together and continues to the north and intersects with MS 42, which becomes concurrent. US 11 and MS 42 continue to the northeast to Hattiesburg. US 11 and MS 42 fork, with US 11 heading to the north and MS 42 heading to the east. Eventually, US 11 enters Petal, paralleling the nearby railroad tracks, and US 11 becomes less developed and leaves Petal.

US 11 continues northward and comes to the community of Dragon. The route leaves Dragon and begins a slight curve to the northwest, still paralleling the railroad tracks. At an intersection near Eastabutchie, US 11 crosses the county line and into Jones County.

Jones County

Jasper County

Clarke County

Lauderdale County

History

Major intersections

References

External links

 Mississippi
11
Transportation in Pearl River County, Mississippi
Transportation in Lamar County, Mississippi
Transportation in Forrest County, Mississippi
Transportation in Jones County, Mississippi
Transportation in Jasper County, Mississippi
Transportation in Clarke County, Mississippi
Transportation in Lauderdale County, Mississippi